Bardeen may refer to:

Charles Russell Bardeen (1871–1935), American anatomist, first dean of the medical school of the University of Wisconsin-Madison
Charles V. Bardeen (1850–1903), American jurist
Charles William Bardeen (1847–1924), American educator
George Bardeen (1850–1924), American businessman and politician from Michigan
James M. Bardeen (1939–2022), American physicist
John Bardeen (1908–1991), American physicist and electrical engineer; co-inventor of the transistor; twice Nobel Prize winner
William A. Bardeen (born 1941), American theoretical physicist, son of John Bardeen